The 1990 480 km of Montreal (promoted as the Player's Ltée Mondial Montréal) was the eighth round of the 1990 World Sportscar Championship season, taking place at Circuit Gilles Villeneuve, Canada. It took place on September 23, 1990.

The race was ended just after half distance due to a heavy accident. Jésus Pareja's Brun 962C collided with a manhole cover which had been pulled free by the ground effects of the car ahead of it, leading to a large fire.  Concern over the manhole covers led to the organizers stopping the race a few laps later, with half points being awarded due to failing to complete 75% of the race distance.

This race also saw the competition debut of Peugeot, with their new 905.

Official results

Statistics
 Pole Position - #1 Team Sauber Mercedes - 1:25.407
 Fastest Lap - #1 Team Sauber Mercedes - 1:28.725
 Distance - 267.79 km
 Average Speed - 153.461 km/h

External links
 WSPR-Racing - 1990 Montreal results

Montreal 480
Montreal
Montreal